The 1929 Orange Tornadoes season was their first in the league. The team went 3–5–4, finishing seventh in the league.

Schedule

Standings

References

Orange Tornadoes seasons
Orange Tornadoes
Orange Tornadoes